Minuscule 108 (in the Gregory-Aland numbering), A144 (Soden), is a Greek minuscule manuscript of the New Testament, on parchment leaves. Paleographically it has been assigned to the 11th century. It has complex contents with some marginalia.

Description 

The codex contains a complete text of the four Gospels with a commentary on 426 parchment leaves. The text is written stichometrically in one column per page. The initial letters in gold.

There is also a division according to the Ammonian Sections (in Mark 233 sections, the last in 16:8), with references to the Eusebian Canons.

Text 

The Greek text of the codex is a representative of the Byzantine text-type. Aland placed it in Category V.

It was not examined by Claremont Profile Method.

It has not the Pericope Adulterae (John 7:53-8:11).

History 
It once belonged to Jan Parrhassius, then to Antonio Seripandi, then to the monastery of St. John de Carbonaria in Naples. It was examined by Treschov, Birch, Alter, Scholz, and Burgon. Alter used it in his edition of the Greek text of the New Testament. C. R. Gregory saw it in 1887.

Formerly it was held at the Imperial Library in Vienna (Suppl. Gr. 6). Currently it is housed at the Biblioteca Nazionale Vittorio Emanuele III (Cod. Neapol. ex Vind. 3) at Naples.

See also 
 List of New Testament minuscules
 Biblical manuscript
 Textual criticism
 Lectionary 138

References

Further reading 

 

Greek New Testament minuscules
11th-century biblical manuscripts